Jefferson Bancroft (April 30, 1803 – January 3, 1890) was a farmer and politician who served as the sixth Mayor of Lowell, Massachusetts.

Bancroft was born on April 30, 1803, in Warwick, Massachusetts.

From 1831 to his death in 1890 Bancroft was a Deputy Sheriff of Middlesex County.

Bancroft was a member of the Lowell City Council in 1839 and 1840, and a member of the Lowell Board of Aldermen from 1841 and 1842.

Massachusetts House of Representatives
Beginning in 1840 Bancroft served four terms in the Massachusetts House representing Lowell.  While in the Massachusetts House Bancroft sat as a member of the Whig Party.

Death

Bancroft died on January 3, 1890, at his farm in Tyngborough, Massachusetts.  He is buried in Lowell Cemetery.

References

1803 births
Mayors of Lowell, Massachusetts
People from Warwick, Massachusetts
Members of the Massachusetts House of Representatives
Lowell, Massachusetts City Council members
Massachusetts Whigs
19th-century American politicians
1890 deaths
Farmers from Massachusetts